Flemons is a surname. Notable people with the surname include:

Dom Flemons (born 1982), American multi-instrumentalist and singer-songwriter
Ronald Flemons (born 1979), American football player
Wade Flemons (1940–1993), American singer
Will Flemons, American basketball player